The Mohican's Daughter is a 1922 American silent romantic drama film directed by Sam Taylor and Stanner E.V. Taylor and starring Nancy Deaver, William H. Thompson and Paul Panzer. It is based on the 1904 short story The Story of Jees Uck by Jack London,

Cast
 Nancy Deaver as Jees Uck
 Hazel Washburn as 	Kitty Shannon
 Sazon King as 	Neil Bonner
 William H. Thompson as 	Amos Pentley 
 Jack Newton as 	Jack Hollis
 Paul Panzer as 	Father La Claire
 Nick Thompson as 	Chatanna
 Mortimer Snow as 	Nashinta
 John Webb Dillion as 	A Halfbreed 
 Myrtle Morse as Inigo, his wife
 Rita Abrams as 	Their child

References

Bibliography
 Connelly, Robert B. The Silents: Silent Feature Films, 1910-36, Volume 40, Issue 2. December Press, 1998.
 Munden, Kenneth White. The American Film Institute Catalog of Motion Pictures Produced in the United States, Part 1. University of California Press, 1997.

External links
 

1922 films
1922 drama films
1920s English-language films
American silent feature films
Silent American drama films
American black-and-white films
Films directed by Sam Taylor
Films directed by Stanner E.V. Taylor
Films based on works by Jack London
Films based on short fiction
1920s American films